Kai language may be 

Kaiy language
Kei language (Keiese)
Kâte language